Joost van der Westhuizen (20 February 1971 – 6 February 2017) was a South African professional rugby union player who made 89 appearances in test matches for the national team, scoring 38 tries. He mostly played as a scrum-half and participated in three Rugby World Cups, most notably in the 1995 tournament, which was won by South Africa. He is widely regarded as one of the greatest scrumhalves of all time.

He captained the national side on ten occasions and was part of the team that won South Africa's first Tri-Nations title in 1998. Domestically he played for the provincial side the Blue Bulls from 1993 to 2003, with whom he won two domestic Currie Cup trophies in 1998 and 2002, and from 1996 until his retirement in 2003 played Super 12 rugby for Northern Transvaal (later renamed the Bulls). He was inducted into the International Rugby Hall of Fame in 2007 and later into the World Rugby Hall of Fame. 

In 2011, it was announced that van der Westhuizen had motor neurone disease. He eventually began using a wheelchair and experienced speech problems, yet still raised awareness of the disease through his charity, the J9 Foundation.

Early life
Van der Westhuizen was born on 20 February 1971 in Pretoria, South Africa. He was educated at Hoërskool F.H. Odendaal and at the University of Pretoria where he obtained a Bachelor of Commerce degree. He played for the Junior Springboks in 1992.

Rugby career
Van der Westhuizen spent his entire provincial career with South African side the Blue Bulls, from 1993 until 2003, whereupon he retired from playing rugby. He played Super 12 for Northern Transvaal (later renamed the Bulls) from the competition's inception in 1996 until his retirement in 2003.

He spent his entire career as a scrum-half, despite standing 6 ft 2 ins, an unusually tall height for a player in this position.

He was known for finding and penetrating the tiniest gaps in opposition defences.

His first international cap came aged 22 against Argentina in Buenos Aires on the 1993 tour. The following year he scored two tries in a memorable performance against Scotland at Murrayfield.

South Africa hosted the 1995 Rugby World Cup. This was their first time playing in a World Cup, a consequence of the previous apartheid. In the final the Springboks faced New Zealand, who were favourites to win the tournament. On New Zealand's wing was Jonah Lomu, an emergent talent, capable of making powerful runs from deep. Lomu was effectively marked and Van der Westhuizen made several tackles, including one just outside the 22m line. In 1997, he captained South Africa's Sevens team to the final at the 1997 Rugby World Cup Sevens in Hong Kong, where they were beaten by Fiji.

Van der Westhuizen was part of the team that won South Africa's first Tri-Nations series title in 1998. He captained the Bulls to the 1998 Currie Cup. He first captained the South Africa team in 1999. That year South Africa finished third at the World Cup. After the tournament he discovered he had sustained a serious injury to ligaments in his knee in a match a fortnight earlier. Injuries sustained while on international duty led to him missing the greater parts of three consecutive Super 12 seasons in 1998, 1999 and 2000.

In November 2001, he became the first person to play one hundred matches for the Springboks. Welsh club side Newport RFC had tried to sign him in 2001, but there was pressure on him to play his domestic rugby in South Africa, to be eligible for selection for the national side. His selection for the 2003 World Cup made him the first person to represent South Africa at three finals. The team met the All Blacks in the quarter-finals and were beaten.

In November 2003, van der Westhuizen retired from international rugby, at which point he was South Africa's record test cap holder with 89, and record test try scorer with 38. He had made 111 appearances for South Africa in total, captained them in ten tests, and scored 190 points for his country.

International statistics

Test Match Record

Pld = Games Played, W = Games Won, D = Games Drawn, L = Games Lost, Tri = Tries Scored, Pts = Points Scored

Test tries (38)

World Cup matches
 Champions  Runners-up  Third place  Fourth place

Awards and honours
He was inducted into the International Rugby Hall of Fame in 2007, and in 2015 became a member of the World Rugby Hall of Fame when the International Hall was merged with it.

Private life and controversy
In 2001, he and his wife of six years, Marlene, divorced, shortly before he married Amor Vittone. He had two children with Vittone.

In February 2009, Rapport newspaper and Heat magazine reported that they had video evidence of him engaging in sex play with a mystery blonde and snorting a white substance. Charmaine Weavers claimed to have had an affair with him in an interview with YOU magazine. His marriage to Vittone fell apart. At the end of March he lost his job as a television presenter with the South African broadcaster SuperSport.

On 28 June 2009, he was admitted to hospital with a suspected heart attack, although he was discharged soon afterward when tests found no evidence of heart problems. A panic attack was suspected. On 1 November, coinciding with the release of his autobiography Spieëlbeeld ("Man in the mirror"), van der Westhuizen confessed to being in the controversial sex video and apologised for lying.

In a telephone interview in August 2013 with BBC Sports correspondent James Peacock, he spoke about facing up to the controversy. "What I did went against all my principles - my life was controlled by my mind and I had to make my mistakes to realise what life is all about, I led my life at a hundred miles an hour. I've learned that there are too many things that we take for granted in life and it's only when you lose them that you realise what it is all about. But I know that God is alive in my life and with experience you do learn. I can now talk openly about the mistakes I made because I know my faith won't give up and it won't diminish. It's only when you go through what I am going through that you understand that life is generous."

Illness and death
In May 2011, van der Westhuizen's publicist confirmed that he had been diagnosed with motor neuron disease. Some weakness had first been noticed in his right arm near the end of 2008, but he had put this down to the aftereffects of an old rugby injury. A few months later, Dr Kelbrick, his personal doctor and a family friend, noticed his right arm weakness and arranged for tests. At that time, Van der Westhuizen was given between two and five years to live.

An August 2013 BBC Sport report illustrated the progress of his disease – by then, Van der Westhuizen was using a wheelchair, and his speech had grown increasingly slurred. He told reporter James Peacock,I realise every day could be my last. It's been a rollercoaster from day one and I know I'm on a deathbed from now on. I've had my highs and I have had my lows, but no more. I'm a firm believer that there's a bigger purpose in my life and I am very positive, very happy.

In January 2014, he returned to the United States to participate in clinical studies with ALS researchers at Massachusetts General Hospital in Boston. He planned to visit the Eleanor and Lou Gehrig Center in New York City, which provides support to MND patients, as Van der Westhuizen hoped to start a similar organisation in South Africa. He set up a charitable organisation, the J9 Foundation, to raise awareness, funds and to support research. He regularly spent time with his children, Jordan and Kylie.

A feature-length documentary- Glory Game, directed by Odette Schwegler, followed him for a period while he was dealing with having Motor Neurone Disease. It was broadcast in 2015 on DStv Box Office.

On 4 February 2017 he was admitted to the Intensive Care Unit at the Fourways Life Hospital in Johannesburg where he was placed on a ventilator. He died at his home in Johannesburg surrounded by his family on Monday, 6 February 2017, at the age of 45. A public memorial service was scheduled for 10 February at Loftus Versfeld in Pretoria.

See also
List of South Africa national rugby union players – Springbok no. 593

References

External links

 J9 Foundation website

1971 births
2017 deaths
Afrikaner people
Blue Bulls players
Bulls (rugby union) players
Deaths from motor neuron disease
Neurological disease deaths in South Africa
Male rugby sevens players
Rugby union scrum-halves
South Africa international rugby sevens players
South Africa international rugby union players
South African people of Dutch descent
South African rugby union players
Rugby union players from Pretoria
University of Pretoria alumni
World Rugby Hall of Fame inductees